Gary Thomas Dilweg (born January 3, 1937) is an American politician, teacher, and businessman.

Background
Born in Green Bay, Wisconsin, Dilweg received his bachelor's degree from the United States Naval Academy in 1960 and then went to the University of Texas Law School from 1964 to 1966. He served in the United States Marine Corps from 1960 to 1964. Dilweg lived in the De Pere, Brown County, Wisconsin. Dilweg worked as a sales manager and engineer and was a high school teacher. In 1974, Dilweg served on the De Pere School Board. From 1979 to 1983, Dilweg served the 4th District in the Wisconsin State Assembly and was a Republican.

Family
Dilweg's father LaVern Dilweg served in the United States House of Representatives from Wisconsin. His mother, Eleanor Coleman Dilweg (1906-1978) was an Olympic swimmer from Milwaukee and a former world record holder.

Notes

1937 births
Living people
Politicians from Green Bay, Wisconsin
United States Naval Academy alumni
University of Texas School of Law alumni
Military personnel from Wisconsin
Businesspeople from Wisconsin
Educators from Wisconsin
School board members in Wisconsin
Republican Party members of the Wisconsin State Assembly
People from De Pere, Wisconsin
United States Marine Corps officers